Constitution Hall (also known as Convention Hall, Alaska Constitution Hall and the Student Union Building) houses the student center at the University of Alaska Fairbanks in Fairbanks, Alaska.   Completed in 1955, the building was the site that year of the meeting at which the Alaska State Constitution was drafted, a milestone in the territory's drive for statehood.  It is a reinforced concrete structure two stories high.  The building currently houses a bookstore, barbershop, alumni association offices, and the campus mail room.

The building was listed on the National Register of Historic Places in 2005.

See also
National Register of Historic Places listings in Fairbanks North Star Borough, Alaska

References

1955 establishments in Alaska
Buildings and structures completed in 1955
Buildings and structures on the National Register of Historic Places in Fairbanks North Star Borough, Alaska
Post office buildings on the National Register of Historic Places in Alaska
Pre-statehood history of Alaska
University of Alaska Fairbanks
University and college buildings on the National Register of Historic Places in Alaska